The Women's softball tournament at the 2019 Pan American Games in Lima, Peru will be held between 4 and 10 August 2019. Six nations will participate.

Qualification

Men
A total of five nations qualified to compete. The host nation, Peru, automatically qualified.

Results 
All times are in Peru Time. (UTC−5)

Preliminary round 

Home team in each game is listed first.

Medal round

Semifinals

Final

Grand Final

References 

Women